is a junction passenger railway station located in the city of Kawasaki, Kanagawa, Japan, operated by East Japan Railway Company (JR East).

Lines
Kawasaki Station is served by the following JR East lines.

Station layout

The station has three elevated island platforms serving six tracks, with an elevated station building built into a shopping center. The station has a Midori no Madoguchi staffed ticket office.

Platforms

The song "Ue o Muite Arukou" (上を向いて歩こう, Ue wo Muite Arukou), commonly known worldwide as "Sukiyaki" by Kyu Sakamoto is used as the departure melody for Platforms 1 and 2.

History

The station opened on 10 July 1872 (June 5 in original Japanese calendar then in use) as the first intermediate station of the first railway in Japan when it was providing a trial service on the section between Shinagawa Station and Sakuragichō Station in Yokohama before the official inauguration in October 1872.

The Nambu Railway, which later became the Nambu Line, opened on 9 March 1927.

Kawasaki City Tram operated a  line from its Shiden Kawasaki terminal in front of this station to the now-closed Shiohama Station from 1944 to 1969.

Passenger statistics
In fiscal 2019, the station was used by an average of 215,234 passengers daily (boarding passengers only).

The passenger figures (boarding passengers only) for previous years are as shown below.

Surrounding area

Connected to the west side of the station is the Lazona Kawasaki Plaza shopping mall. Connected to the east of the station is the "Atre Kawasaki" shopping complex. There are also various other commercial establishments around the station, including More-s Department Store, Yodobashi Camera, and Tokyu Hands. Keikyu Kawasaki Station, operated by the private railway operator Keikyu is located to the northeast.

The basement area of the adjoining More's department store is home to what is dubbed "the world's shortest escalator", with a height difference of just .

See also
 List of railway stations in Japan

References

External links

 JR East station information 

Railway stations in Kanagawa Prefecture
Railway stations in Japan opened in 1872
Tōkaidō Main Line
Keihin-Tōhoku Line
Nambu Line
Stations of East Japan Railway Company
Railway stations in Kawasaki, Kanagawa